Carolina Araujo may refer to:
 Carolina Araujo (swimmer) (born 1971), Mozambican swimmer
 Carolina Araujo (mathematician) (born 1976), Brazilian mathematician